Ivan Volodymyrovych Lvov (born 15 November 1991) is a Ukrainian football defender currently playing for Ukrainian Second League club Kremin.

Club history
Ivan Lvov began his football career in Kremin-91 in Kremenchuk. He signed with FC Kremin Kremenchuk during 2009 winter transfer window.

Career statistics

References

External links
  Profile – Official Kremin site
  FC Kremin Kremenchuk Squad on the PFL website
  Profile on the FFU website

1991 births
Living people
FC Kremin Kremenchuk players
Ukrainian footballers
Association football defenders
People from Kremenchuk
Sportspeople from Poltava Oblast
21st-century Ukrainian people